Robert John Bowry (born 19 May 1971) is a former professional footballer who played as a midfielder from 1990 until 2008.

He played in the Premier League with Crystal Palace, and in the Football League with Queens Park Rangers, Millwall and Colchester United. He finished his career in non-league football with Gravesend & Northfleet and Bromley. Born in England, he represented the Saint Kitts and Nevis national team. Upon retiring he worked as a coach and is now a football agent.

Playing career
Bowry began his career at Queens Park Rangers, but he failed to make a first-team league appearance. He moved to Crystal Palace in April 1992 on a free transfer. Helping the team win Division Two in 1993–94, he had made 50 league appearances and scored one goal at Palace before being sold to Millwall in July 1995 for £220,000. Bowry spent six years at Millwall, making 140 league appearances, scoring 5 goals, and also appeared twice in 2000 for Saint Kitts and Nevis national football team. He was released from Millwall in 2001, and signed for Colchester United, where he made 106 league appearances and scored 2 goals. In May 2005, Bowry was released by Colchester. He was signed by Gravesend & Northfleet in July 2005 on a one-year contract. After one season at Gravesend, he joined Bromley in a player-coach role. After two seasons at Bromley, Bowry quit when the club was put up for sale and retired.

Football agent
He is now believed to be a football agent with a number of Premier League and Football League players on his books.

Personal life
Bowry's father was born in Saint Kitts and Nevis while his mother was born in Antigua, Antigua and Barbuda. His son, Daniel Bowry, is also a professional footballer who plays for the Antigua and Barbuda national football team. Bowry's daughter, Lauren, is a singer and dancer who appeared on the BBC talent show Little Mix The Search in 2020, and is currently part of the girl group Melladaze which was formed on the show.

Honours

Club
Crystal Palace
 Football League Second Division Winner (1): 1993–94

Millwall F.C

Football League Trophy Runner Up-1998-99

References

External links

Bobby Bowry at Coludata.co.uk

1971 births
Living people
Citizens of Saint Kitts and Nevis through descent
Saint Kitts and Nevis footballers
Association football forwards
Saint Kitts and Nevis international footballers
Saint Kitts and Nevis people of Antigua and Barbuda descent
Footballers from Croydon
English footballers
Queens Park Rangers F.C. players
Crystal Palace F.C. players
Millwall F.C. players
Colchester United F.C. players
Ebbsfleet United F.C. players
Bromley F.C. players
Premier League players
English sportspeople of Saint Kitts and Nevis descent
English sportspeople of Antigua and Barbuda descent
Association football agents
Association football coaches